"Pensée unique" (French for "single thought") is a pejorative expression for mainstream ideological conformism of any kind, almost always opposed to that of the speaker. Originally, it is a French expression and referred to claims that neoliberalism is the only correct way to structure society. The phrase implies that mainstream discussion is limited by ideological assumptions of what is possible. One example of pensée unique given by critics was the motto of Margaret Thatcher (former Prime Minister of the United Kingdom): TINA ("There is no alternative").

The expression was coined by Jean-François Kahn, editor-in-chief of L'Événement du Jeudi, in an editorial in January 1992. The phrase pensée unique is often used by political parties and organisations and in criticism.

The term has been used regarding prohibitionism of marijuana, with some commenters saying that pensée unique is a barrier to legalization.

See also
 Conventional wisdom
There is no alternative

References

Further reading

 La pensée unique, collective work (with Jean Foyer and Jean-Pierre Thiollet), Economica/JM. Chardon & D.Lensel Ed., Paris, 1998. 

French words and phrases
Political slurs
Rhetoric